Christian van Uffelen (born 19 December 1966 in Offenbach am Main) is a Dutch-German author and art historian, active in Stuttgart.

Biography
He studied Art History at the University of Münster and afterwards at the University of Mainz, where he obtained his MA.

His focus is on medieval architecture, classical modernity and contemporary construction. He has written several newspaper articles and books on these topics as well as a great number of articles on art and architectural history, in general for encyclopedias.

Selected works
 Berlin: Architecture and Design, teNeues Verlag, 2003, 
 Paris - The Architecture Guide (with Markus Golser), Braun Publishing, 2008, 
 Cinema Architecture, Braun Publishing, 2009, 
 Masterpieces: Bridge Architecture + Design, Braun Publishing, 2009, 
 Street Furniture, Aurora Production AG, 2010, 
 Contemporary Museums - Architecture, History, Collections, Braun Publishing, 2010, 
 Re-Use Architecture, Braun Publishing, 2009,  
 Light in Architecture - Architecture in Focus, Braun Publishing, 2011
 Airport Architecture - Architecture in Focus, Braun Publishing, 2012

References

External links
 Chris van Uffelen - Braun Publishing
 Works by Chris van Uffelen 
 
 

1966 births
Living people
German people of Dutch descent
People from Offenbach am Main
University of Münster alumni
Johannes Gutenberg University Mainz alumni
German architectural historians
German art historians
German male non-fiction writers